High/Low is the debut studio album by alternative rock band Nada Surf, released on June 18, 1996. The album is best known for its hit single "Popular".

Track listing
All tracks written by Matthew Caws and Daniel Lorca except where noted.
 "Deeper Well" – 3:55
 "The Plan" – 4:31
 "Popular" – 3:48  - written by Matthew Caws, Daniel Lorca and Gloria Winters 
 "Sleep" – 3:47
 "Stalemate" – 3:38
 "Treehouse" – 2:43
 "Icebox" – 3:17
 "Psychic Caramel" – 4:00
 "Hollywood" – 2:20
 "Zen Brain" – 4:28

Personnel
Nada Surf

Matthew Caws – guitar, vocals
Daniel Lorca – bass
Ira Elliot – drums

Production

 Bruce Calder – engineer, mixer
 George Marino – mastering
 Ric Ocasek – producer
 Andy Salas – assistant engineer

Charts
Album

Singles

Nada Surf albums
1996 debut albums
Albums produced by Ric Ocasek
Elektra Records albums
Albums recorded at Electric Lady Studios